Cyclostrongylus elegans is a species of oesophageal parasitic nematodes of macropodid marsupials in Australia.

References

External links 
 Cyclostrongylus elegans at Atlas of Living Australia

Parasitic nematodes of mammals
Parasites of marsupials
Rhabditida
Nematodes described in 1982
Marsupials of Australia